Houtkoppen is a suburb of Johannesburg, South Africa. It is located in Region 1.

Johannesburg Region A